Ihamaru Nature Reserve is a nature reserve which is located in Põlva County, Estonia.

The area of the nature reserve is 255 ha.

The protected area was founded in 1981 to protect Ihamaru primeval forest. In 2005 the protected area was designated to the nature reserve.

References

Nature reserves in Estonia
Geography of Põlva County